The I-League 2008–2009 season began on 26 September 2008 and finished on 16 April 2009 with a break in December for the Federation Cup and Durand Cup.  Most games this season were played on Saturday's and Sunday's to attract larger crowds.  After a successful first season for the I League, the second season featured 12 teams from four cities – again this would be expanded in the 2009–10 season to 14 teams.

The champion in the I-League qualified for the AFC Champions League 2010 qualifying playoffs in 2010, while the bottom two teams were relegated to I-League 2nd Division for the next season.

Gallery

Teams

League table

Home and away season

Round 1

Round 2

Round 3

Round 4

Round 5

Round 6

Round 7

Round 8

Round 9

Round 10

Round 12

Round 13

Round 14

Round 15

Round 16

Round 17

Round 18

Round 19

Round 20

Round 21

Round 22

Top scorers

External links
I League news and results
I League Photos at Mango Peel

 
I-League seasons

1
India